This is a list of songs recorded by American singer and songwriter Laura Branigan. Between 1981 and 1993, Branigan recorded songs for seven studio albums, as well as for several soundtrack releases and various artist albums. Prior to the final release of her debut album, Branigan, in 1982, many songs from early recording sessions for the album were shelved. While some were released as promotional singles, and others later released as b-sides or as bonus tracks on reissues, most of the tracks remain unreleased. In addition, Branigan also recorded two new tracks for The Best of Branigan in 1995, her first North American greatest hits album. These marked her final recordings with long-time label Atlantic Records while she took an extended hiatus from the music industry to care for her husband, who was diagnosed with colon cancer, and ultimately to mourn his death. In the late 1990s and up until her own death in 2004, Branigan recorded a handful of songs for compilations as well as for a proposed comeback album. The project was never completed however, and none of these songs have been officially released.

Songs

References

 
Branigan, Laura